Xiaoxiang, also transliterated XiaoXiang, Hsiao Hsiang, and Chiu Chiang, in some older sources, refers to the "lakes and rivers" region in south-central China south of the middle-reaches of the Yangtze River and corresponding, more or less, with Hunan province. Xiaoxiang is less a precise geographic entity than a concept. Xiaoxiang is used in the genre of Xiaoxiang poetry of Classical Chinese poetry and in literature for symbolic purposes, in part because this was a significant area, which at least through the Song dynastic era China was still considered a wild place full of malaria, barbarians, and wild beasts. Indeed, for much of early Chinese history, this area belonged not to China, but to the independent state of Chu. Beginning at least with Qu Yuan, in the third century BCE, this region came to symbolically represent the unjust exile of a talented minister or government official by an unappreciative king or emperor.

The following quote succinctly describes the authors who helped shape the literary image of the Xiaoxiang and their feelings in that regard:

The name Xiaoxiang comes in part from the name of the Xiang River, which rises in the mountains of Guangxi and flows into Dongting Lake. There is a modern Xiao River, which is a tributary of the Xiang River, and joins it near present-day cities of Yongzhou and Changsha; however, the name Xiaoxiang predates the bestowing of that name on the Xiao River: originally the adjective xiao, meaning "clear and deep", was used to descriptively for the Xiang River.

The Xiaoxiang region is the somewhat imaginative location of the various eponymous and highly symbolic Eight Views of Xiaoxiang series of eight paintings and/or poetry verses.

See also
Cangwu County
Changsha
Chu (state)
Chuci
Classical Chinese poetry
Dong Yuan
Dongting Lake
Eight Views of Xiaoxiang
Hunan
Miluo River
Qu Yuan
Shōnan
Shun (Chinese leader)
Spotted bamboo
Xiang River
Xiang River goddesses
Xiao River
Xiaoxiang poetry
Yongzhou

References

Citations

Sources 
 Cited sources

 

Chinese poetry allusions